Severomorsk, known as Vayenga until April 18, 1951, is a closed town in Murmansk Oblast, Russia. Severomorsk is the main administrative base of the Russian Northern Fleet.

History

Early settlement
The first settlement on the site of the modern city arose between 1896 and 1897. It was named Vayenga, after the river, the name of which itself comes from the Sami "vayongg", meaning "doe" or "reindeer". In 1917, only thirteen people lived in the settlement, who engaged in hunting, fishing and animal husbandry.

The founding of the Northern Fleet Base
In 1926, the Murmansk office of logging was founded, one of the artels of which was sent to Vayenga. A barracks, a dormitory, and a banya were built, and a telephone line was laid through the village. In 1933, the bay was chosen as one of the bases for the newly created Northern Fleet. From 1934 and until the beginning of World War II, wooden and brick buildings, as well as military installations, were built in the settlement, and the Vayenga-1 naval airfield was built in the neighbouring bay. From August 1941, all construction was suspended. The airfield was used by the British; namely No. 151 Wing RAF to protect the Arctic Convoys before their fighters were later handed over to the Soviet Naval Aviation.

After the end of the war, construction was resumed. Vayenga, taking into account the existing arrangement, was chosen as one of the main bases of the Northern Fleet. On September 1, 1947, staff and management of the Northern Fleet were relocated from Polyarny to Vayenga. Also in 1947, the first secondary school in the city was opened. The population of Vayenga was then 3,884. In 1948, Vayenga's village Soviet of deputies of workers was opened.

Severomorsk
On April 18, 1951, Vayenga received town status and was renamed to Severomorsk, from the Russian "sever" (север), meaning "north", and "more" (море), meaning "sea". By the 1960s, the city was already thoroughly equipped. The city had its own bakery, sausage factory, and soft drink bottling plant, and a swimming pool was being built. On November 26, 1996, by the decree of the President of Russia, the city of Severomorsk, as a major naval base, was converted into a closed city. Settlements that have been merged into it include Safonovo, Roslyakovo, Safonovo-1, Severomorsk-3, and Shchukozero.

Geography and climate

Location
Severomorsk is located on the Kola Peninsula in the Arctic Circle, in the permafrost zone, on the rocky east coast of the Kola Bay of the Barents Sea.

Climate
Severomorsk has a cold sea climate, with relatively mild winters and cool summers. The average temperature in January is -8 °C and 12 °C in July. The average precipitation is around 800 mm per year.

Demographics

Population

On January 1, 2015, out of 1114 Russian cities and towns, Severomorsk was ranked the 329th most populous.

According to the results of the Russian Census of 2010, the population of Severomorsk was 50,060. 26,503 (52.9%) of those were male, and 23,557 (47.1%) were female.

As of 2016, the population of Severomorsk has reached 50,905.

Cityscape

Landmarks
The Monument to the Heroes of Severomorsk, the defenders of the Arctic. More commonly known as the "monument to Alyosha", it is considered to be the symbol of the city. It is a figure of a sailor with an automatic rifle in his hands. It is 15 meters tall and stands on a 10-meter tall pedestal in the form of a submarine. It was created by the sculptors Georgy and Yury Neroda, and the architects V. Dushkin and A. Shashkov. Installed on Maritime Square on June 10, 1973.
The Monument to the Heroes of the artillery 221-A of the Red Banner Northern Fleet battery. One of the most famous monuments in the city, it is a 130mm ship weapon on a concrete pedestal. It was created by the architects A. Shashkov, T. Shashkova, A. Weisman, and E. Panteleymonov. Installed on North Hill on Maritime Square on November 6, 1961.
The Monument to the aviators of Severomorsk, "Aircraft IL-4".  The plane was found in the hills by a search party, was brought back to the city, and was then restored over the course of a year. It was created by the architects G. Yevdokimova and S. Bachurin, and the engineer A. Strashny. Installed on Courage Square on July 26, 1981.
The Memorial to the citizens of Severomorsk who did not return from the war. A monument in the form of an MT-LB armoured vehicle, it is dedicated to the soldiers killed in action in Afghanistan and the North Caucasus region. Installed on Courage Square on 19 July 2013, next to the "Aircraft IL-4".
The Monument to the "Torpedo boat TKA-12". In the Great Patriotic War, this boat was commanded by the twice Hero of the Soviet Union Alexander Shabalin. It was created by the architects V. Alekseev and V. Gopak, and the engineer A. Strashny. Installed on Courage Square on July 31, 1983.
Bust of the twice Hero of the Soviet Union Boris Safonov. Created by the sculptor E. Kitaychuk and the architect A. Shashkov. Installed on Safonov Square in 1967.
Bust of the Hero of the Russian Federation Timur Apakidze. Created by the local artists S. Abarina and P. Abarin, and the main engineer of the project, A. Rechits. Installed on Safonovo Square in July 2003.
The Museum of Severomorsk's and the Navy's History. Opened by the Severomorsk administration in October 1996 on Safonov street.
Museum "Submarine K-21". A branch of the Naval Museum of the Northern Fleet. Opened in July 1983 on Courage Square.

Politics

Local government
The representative bodies of the local self-government are the City Council of Deputies. The mayor of Severomorsk is Alexander Abramov.

Since 1991, the executive power has been headed by Vitaly Voloshin. In the spring of 2011, he was approved to the post of the Head of Administration of Severomorsk. Since April 16, 2013, the position is occupied by Irina Norina.

Administrative and municipal status
Within the framework of administrative divisions, it is, together with the urban-type settlement of Safonovo and two rural localities, incorporated as the closed administrative-territorial formation of Severomorsk—an administrative unit with the status equal to that of the districts. As a municipal division, the closed administrative-territorial formation of Severomorsk is incorporated as Severomorsk Urban Okrug.

Economy

Industry
Most of Severomorsk's industry is related to food, particularly the Severmorsk Dairy Plant, and the Toni Bottling Plant. There are also construction and shipyard companies, and a developed infrastructure of housing and communal and consumer services, as well as trade.

Military

The town is the main administrative base of the Russian Northern Fleet. Severomorsk has the largest dry dock on the Kola Peninsula.

On May 13, 1984, on the outskirts of Severomorsk, there was a major fire at a stockpile of naval missiles that resulted in numerous large explosions on May 17. The incident killed 200–300 people and destroyed at least one-third of the Northern Fleet's stockpile of surface-to-air missiles.

Famous people
Alexander Moiseenko, Ukrainian chess Grandmaster, born in Severomorsk in 1980.
Boris Safonov, Soviet Naval Aviation fighter ace of World War II, served at Vaenga from 1940 until his death in 1942.
Elena Vaenga (real name, Elena Vladimirovna Khrulyova), singer, songwriter and actress, born in Severomorsk in 1977.
Lesya Yaroslavskaya, pop singer, born in Severomorsk in 1981.

References

Notes

Sources

External links
Official website of Severomorsk 
Unofficial website of Severomorsk

 
Closed cities
Russian and Soviet Navy bases
Populated places of Arctic Russia
Port cities and towns in Russia
Barents Sea
Populated coastal places in Russia
Populated places established in the 1890s
Kolsky Uyezd
Former urban-type settlements of Murmansk Oblast